Gibran Mohammed (born 31 July 1983) is a Trinidadian cricketer. He played in 32 first-class and 6 List A matches for Trinidad and Tobago from 2003 to 2012.

See also
 List of Trinidadian representative cricketers

References

External links
 

1983 births
Living people
Trinidad and Tobago cricketers